6 The Shambles is an historic building in the English city of York, North Yorkshire. A Grade II listed building, part of the structure dates to the late 18th century, with a renovation occurring in the 20th century, including the addition of a shopfront.

Per Historic England, its "grey-brown mottled" bricks are in Flemish bond, while the shopfront and cornice are made of timber.

On the second floor is a cast-iron Art Nouveau fireplace.

As of 2023, the building is occupied by York Ghost Merchants.

References 

6
Houses in North Yorkshire
18th-century establishments in England
Grade II listed buildings in York
Grade II listed houses
18th century in York